One and Only (Chinese: 周生如故) is a 2021 Chinese period romantic television series, starring Ren Jialun and Bai Lu. The series is based on the novel Yi Sheng Yi Shi Mei Ren Gu (一生一世美人骨) by Mo Bao Fei Bao. It’s available on iQiyi and iQ.com from August 18, 2021.  The series is followed by a modern companion series Forever and Ever.  Both series were adapted from the same novel, released back to back, and follows the same characters in different eras (one historical, one modern).

Cast

Main 

 Ren Jialun as Zhou Sheng Chen (Jr. Nanchen King, Cui Shi Yi's master), voiced by Bian Jiang
 Bai Lu as Cui Shi Yi (daughter of Cui Family, Zhou Sheng Chen's eleventh protégé)

Supporting 

 Wang Xingyue as Liu Zixing, historical prototype emperor Xiaozhuang of Northern Wei
 Li Yiru as Hong Xiaoyu
 Zhou Lula as Xiao Yan
 Yao Yichen as Cui Feng
 Su Mengyun as Feng Qiao
 Wu Mansi as Princess Xinghua
 Liu Weiwei as Cui Wenjun
 Fu Jun as Xie Chong
 Liang Aiqi as Qi Zhenzhen
 Yu Yang as Cui Guang
 Yuan Ruohang as Xie Yun
 Zhang Chenghang as Zhou Tianxing
 Wang Xinghan as Zhao Teng
 Zhang Zhang as Cheng Xi
 Han Chengyu as Huan Yu
 Xi Xue as Gao Huaiyang
 Dai Si as Jin Zhener

Production 
The series began filming in November 2020, and wrapped up in January 2021.

References

External links 

 One And Only on Sina Weibo
 One And Only on Douban

2021 Chinese television series debuts
IQIYI original programming